Jerome Watson (born September 28, 1974) is an American former U.S. soccer forward who spent time in the Western Soccer Alliance, American Professional Soccer League and A-League.

Watson grew up in San Diego, California and attended La Jolla High School. He played college soccer at the University of California, Davis, where he was named All-Conference four times and Conference MVP once. 

In 1988, Watson joined the San Diego Nomads of the Western Soccer League. That year he led the Nomads in scoring with six goals which also put him in second place on the WSL goals list. The following season, he topped the league’s points list with 10 goals and 7 assists. Despite that, he was not selected to the WSL All Star team. He also was never considered for the U.S. Men's National Team in the lead up to the FIFA World Cup in Italy in 1990, despite that team's dearth of quality strikers. Before the 1990 season, the WSL and the American Soccer League merged to form the American Professional Soccer League (APSL).  However, at the end of the 1990 season, the Nomads withdrew from the APSL and Watson moved to the Colorado Foxes (APSL).  He remained with the Foxes through the end of the 1996 season. The APSL, which had been renamed the A-League, merged with the USISL between the 1996 and 1997 seasons.  With the merger, Watson moved to the California Jaguars for a single season with the team.  In 1998, he made his last move as a professional player when he joined the San Diego Flash. The Flash were the old Colorado Foxes and this was their first season in its new city having moved from Colorado. Watson remained with the Flash through at least the 2001 season, spending some time as an assistant coach with them.

In 2003, Watson spent a single season as coach of the San Diego City College soccer team.

He continues to play rec league soccer with the San Diego Nomads senior team in the San Diego County Soccer League.  He currently is the assistant coach for San Diego United of the NPSL and also coaches their Under 23 team as well as the head coach for the San Diego Flash, and coach for the San Diego Nomads.

References

External links
 1989 San Diego Nomads roster

1960 births
Living people
American soccer players
American soccer coaches
American Professional Soccer League players
California Jaguars players
Colorado Foxes players
San Diego Flash players
Nomads Soccer Club players
USL First Division players
Western Soccer Alliance players
University of California, Davis alumni
Association football forwards